Hagnagora subrosea is a species of moth of the family Geometridae first described by William Warren in 1909. It is found in Peru.

Adults have a unique combination of a pale brown wing colour with two white transversal bands on the forewings not found in any other species of
Hagnagora.

References

Moths described in 1909
Larentiinae